Alisal High School is an American public high school opened in 1965 and located in Salinas, California. Alisal's school colors are green, black and white. Their mascot is Tommy the Trojan.

Demographics 
Currently, there are about 3300 students attending Alisal, with 98% of them having Hispanic ethnicity. The other 2% are majority Asian and White.  The staff consists of 170 teachers with a teacher-student ratio of 1:32.

Incidents 
On 01 October 2010, A 15-year-old student Jose Daniel Cisneros was killed after being shot several times on an athletic field at Alisal High School while walking to school. Police said that the shooting was gang-related.

Sports 
Football, cross-country, cheer, tennis, volleyball (in the fall); boys' soccer, girls' soccer, basketball, wrestling (in the winter); and track and field, baseball, softball, swimming, golf (in the spring) are the present sports available at the school. Among these, the boys' varsity soccer team of 2009–2010, part of division 1 of the Central Coast Section (CCS), won the CCS award for the first time in various years. The team won it for the second time during the 2012–2013 season finishing ranked #1 in the state and #2 in the nation.

References

External links

High schools in Monterey County, California
Public high schools in California
Educational institutions established in 1965
1965 establishments in California